The USS Guinevere (IX-67) was a patrol vessel of the United States Navy that operated in service from 1942 to 1945.

Yacht
Guinevere was built for Edgar Palmer of New York who specified diesel electric propulsion for what was at the time the largest such yacht built in the United States and the largest fore and aft schooner yacht so far built worldwide. The yacht's power plant consisted of two Winton six cylinder, 350 H.P. diesels directly connected to Westinghouse generators. The generators provided power to a 555-horsepower Westinghouse motor directly coupled to the propeller.  Design was by A. Loring Swansey with the diesel electric design in cooperation with a Commander Fisher, USN. The yacht was rated for a speed of  under engines alone with 11,000 mile cruising range. A two-ton refrigeration unit, two 15 kilowatt generators, bilge and other pumps, ventilation, power hoists, lights and radio were provided within the electrical system. Batteries provided power at night when the power plant was shut down or in emergencies. Guinevere was built by George Lawley & Son, of Neponset, Massachusetts, and launched April 21, 1921.

The finished yacht had six large staterooms with an additional on the deck with a private stairway to spaces below. Interior trim was entirely of walnut and teak. Auxiliary boats consisted of a  30' 5.5" (9.28m) owner's launch, a 25' 11.5" (7.91m) crew launch, and a 21' 3" (6.48m) sailing lifeboat; all except lifeboat powered.

Guinevere was requisitioned by the War Shipping Administration and allocated to the Navy on the outbreak of war.

U. S. Navy service
USS Guinevere (IX-67), an unclassified miscellaneous vessel, was the second ship of the United States Navy of that name. In both cases the name was given by the ship's former owner, possibly for Queen Guinevere or another woman named for her. The auxiliary schooner was acquired from Edgar Palmer on March 24, 1842, and commissioned on June 16, 1942 at Brooklyn, New York.

After a brief shakedown, Guinevere performed harbor patrol at Boston, Massachusetts, escorted newly formed convoys out to sea, and periodically sailed to patrol off the coast of Greenland. She decommissioned on August 2, 1945 and her name was struck from the Naval Vessel Register on August 13. She was transferred to the Maritime Commission for sale into private ownership on April 25, 1946.

Post war
In 1947 the yacht was operated as an undocumented vessel by David Johnson of East St. Louis, Illinois. Washington, D.C. columnist Tom Kelly served aboard and gathered old shipmates for his 75th birthday. Some had attempted to find what happened to the vessel after it vanished from records after ownership by David Johnson. They had been unable to find a solid trace despite rumors ranging from Greece to South America. Arthur Kimberly, later associated with the brigantine Romance, became chief mate aboard Guinevere after graduation from the United States Merchant Marine Academy and finishing war service as an officer on oil tankers. At the time Guinevere was engaged as a trading vessel with cargo of sugar and occasional contraband (cigarettes are mentioned) to the Mediterranean. Despite his affection for the vessel the smuggling was the cause for his leaving while in the Mediterranean.

Footnotes

References

External links
 
 Stephen S. Roberts, "Small IX: Auxiliary Schooners etc." (shipscribe)

Unclassified miscellaneous vessels of the United States Navy
World War II patrol vessels of the United States
Schooners of the United States Navy
Ships built in Boston
1921 ships